Cuyamungue Grant is an unincorporated community and census-designated place in Santa Fe County, New Mexico, United States. Its population was 226 as of the 2010 census.

Geography

Demographics

Education
It is zoned to Pojoaque Valley Schools. Pojoaque Valley High School is the zoned comprehensive high school.

References

Census-designated places in New Mexico
Census-designated places in Santa Fe County, New Mexico